Keita Bates-Diop (born January 23, 1996) is an American professional basketball player for the San Antonio Spurs  of the National Basketball Association (NBA). He played college basketball for the Ohio State Buckeyes.

Early life and high school career
Keita Bates-Diop was born on January 23, 1996, in Sacramento, California to Richard and Wilma Bates. His parents added Diop to his surname. His father Richard studied under Cheikh Anta Diop, a Senegalese scientist and anthropologist.
The small forward played for University High School in Normal, Illinois.  He averaged 18.4 points, 6.7 rebounds and 2.3 blocks as a junior. He was considered one of the top 5 candidates for Illinois Mr. Basketball by the Chicago Tribune. Bates-Diop was ranked no. 24 nationally in his class by Rivals.com.

College career
Bates-Diop was a bench player as a freshman at OSU in the 2014–15 season. As a sophomore, he expanded his role on the team and averaged 11.8 points and 6.4 rebounds per game. But as a junior, he suffered a stress fracture in his left leg, sitting out all but the first nine games, while the Buckeyes limped to a 17–15 record without him. In those nine games, Bates-Diop averaged 9.7 points and 5.2 rebounds per game. He was granted a medical redshirt and came into his redshirt junior campaign one of the top options for new coach Chris Holtmann.

Bates-Diop earned his first Big Ten player of the week honors on December 11, 2017, after notching a career-high 27 points in a 97–62 win over William & Mary. On January 9, 2018, Bates-Diop was recognized as the Oscar Robertson National Player of the Week by the United States Basketball Writers Association after strong performances against Iowa Hawkeyes men's basketball and Michigan State. Bates-Diop tied a then-career high with 27 points and grabbed 13 rebounds in a victory against Iowa. Against top-ranked Michigan State, he scored a career-high 32 points in an 80–64 win. He also received his second Big Ten player of the week recognition. Bates-Diop received his second consecutive player of the week nod on January 15, with a 26-point, eight rebound outing in a 91–69 win over Maryland and 20 points, nine rebounds in a victory versus Rutgers.

On February 26, 2018, Bates-Diop was named the Big Ten Player of the Year. He averaged 19.8 points and 8.7 rebounds per game. Following Ohio State's loss in the 2018 NCAA men's basketball tournament, Bates-Diop announced his intention to forgo his final season of collegiate eligibility and declared for the 2018 NBA draft.

Professional career

Minnesota Timberwolves (2018–2020)
On June 21, 2018, Bates-Diop was drafted by the Minnesota Timberwolves with the 48th pick in the 2018 NBA draft. On July 7, 2018, Bates-Diop signed with the Timberwolves. He participated in the NBA Summer League in 2018 and 2019.

Denver Nuggets (2020)
On February 5, 2020, the Timberwolves traded Bates-Diop to the Denver Nuggets in a four-team trade. He was assigned to the Windy City Bulls on March 1. Bates-Diop was waived by the Nuggets on November 22, 2020

San Antonio Spurs (2020–present)
On November 29, 2020, the San Antonio Spurs announced that they had signed Bates-Diop to a two-way contract. On September 7, 2021, the Spurs re-signed him. On December 23, 2021, Bates-Diop scored a career-high 30 points on eleven-of-eleven shooting with seven rebounds and a steal in a 138–110 win over the Los Angeles Lakers.

Career statistics

NBA

Regular season

|-
| style="text-align:left;"|
| style="text-align:left;"|Minnesota
| 30 || 3 || 16.8 || .423 || .250 || .643 || 2.8 || .6 || .6 || .5 || 5.0
|-
| style="text-align:left;" rowspan=2|
| style="text-align:left;"|Minnesota
| 37 || 0 || 17.5 || .422 || .330 || .708 || 3.0 || .8 || .5 || .5 || 6.8
|-
| style="text-align:left;"|Denver
| 7 || 0 || 14.0 || .464 || .333 || .800 || 2.4 || .0 || .3 || .6 || 5.4
|-
| style="text-align:left;"|
| style="text-align:left;"|San Antonio
| 30 || 0 || 8.2 || .448 || .294 || .667 || 1.6 || .4 || .4 || .2 || 2.6
|-
| style="text-align:left;"|
| style="text-align:left;"|San Antonio
| 59 || 14 || 16.2 || .517 || .309 || .754 || 3.9 || .7 || .5 || .2 || 5.7
|- class="sortbottom"
| style="text-align:center;" colspan="2"|Career
| 163 || 17 || 15.0 || .462 || .304 || .714 || 3.0 || .6 || .5 || .3 || 5.2

Playoffs

|-
| style="text-align:left;"| 2020
| style="text-align:left;"| Denver
| 5 || 0 || 4.8 || .200 || .000 || .500 || 1.2 || .2 || .0 || .0 || .6

College

|-
| style="text-align:left;"|2014–15
| style="text-align:left;"|Ohio State
| 33 || 0 || 9.9 || .473 || .462 || .679 || 2.1 || .5 || .3 || .6 || 3.8
|-
| style="text-align:left;"|2015–16
| style="text-align:left;"|Ohio State
| 33 || 33 || 31.5 || .453 || .324 || .787 || 6.4 || 1.1 || .7 || 1.2 || 11.8
|-
| style="text-align:left;"|2016–17
| style="text-align:left;"|Ohio State
| 9 || 3 || 23.3 || .500 || .200 || .714 || 5.2 || 1.3 || .2 || 1.3 || 9.7
|-
| style="text-align:left;"|2017–18
| style="text-align:left;"|Ohio State
| 34 || 34 || 33.1 || .480 || .359 || .794 || 8.7 || 1.6 || .9 || 1.6 || 19.8
|- class="sortbottom"
| style="text-align:center;" colspan="2"|Career
| 109 || 70 || 24.8 || .472 || .352 || .776 || 5.7 || 1.1 || .6 || 1.2 || 11.7

References

External links
 Ohio State Buckeyes bio
 NBADraft.net profile

1996 births
Living people
African-American basketball players
All-American college men's basketball players
American men's basketball players
Basketball players from California
Basketball players from Illinois
Denver Nuggets players
Iowa Wolves players
Minnesota Timberwolves draft picks
Minnesota Timberwolves players
Ohio State Buckeyes men's basketball players
People from Normal, Illinois
San Antonio Spurs players
Small forwards
Windy City Bulls players
21st-century African-American sportspeople